Saint-Martin-du-Puy is the name of the following communes in France:

 Saint-Martin-du-Puy, Gironde, in the Gironde department
 Saint-Martin-du-Puy, Nièvre, in the Nièvre department